Welcome to Collinwood is a 2002 American caper comedy film written and directed by Anthony and Joe Russo and starring William H. Macy, Isaiah Washington, Sam Rockwell, Michael Jeter (in his last movie, during his lifetime), Luis Guzmán, Patricia Clarkson, Andrew Davoli, George Clooney, Jennifer Esposito, and Gabrielle Union. It is a remake of the Oscar-nominated 1958 Italian film Big Deal on Madonna Street (I soliti ignoti) by Mario Monicelli.

The screenplay concerns a group of small-time thieves and misfits from the Collinwood neighborhood of Cleveland, who attempt to carry out a major theft from a jeweller's apartment safe.

Plot
Cosimo is arrested when he and Toto try to steal a car. In prison, he meets an old man who tells him of a “Bellini” - a perfect heist - that he could not carry out because of a life sentence. Cosimo asks his girlfriend Rosalind to find a "Mullinski" (slang for someone willing to do prison time in exchange for money) so that he can walk free and pull off the heist. Rosalind and Toto ask misfits Basil, Leon, Riley, who babysits his infant son while needing $1,000 to pay his own wife's jail fine, and Pero "Pepe" Mahalovic, a Serbian American boxer who agrees to confess to Cosimo's crime for $16,000 but ends up being jailed alongside him. While inside, Pero gets Cosimo to tell him what the Bellini is before revealing that his own sentence was suspended, leaving Cosimo still in jail. Returning home, Pero is met by Rosalind and the other four demanding a refund. He tells them he used the $16,000 to pay off debts but will share the Bellini details. The six then decide to carry out the heist themselves.

The Bellini concerns a brick building on Chester converted from a flour factory into apartments and a jewelry store. The old man in jail worked on the conversion and created a false wall between one apartment and the room with the jewelry store safe. Riley steals a video camera from a street market so that the group can get the combination by filming the jeweller opening the safe. After filming fails they hire Jerzy, a safecracker who uses a wheelchair, to teach them how to drill into the safe, whereupon Detective Babitch starts to keep a close eye on them. Then two maiden aunts with a maid named Carmela move into the long-vacant apartment, and so Leon and Basil pretend to accost Carmela while Pero comes to her "rescue" to secure a date in the hope of stealing her keys. Meanwhile, in prison a guard suddenly drops dead and Cosimo uses his uniform to escape. When he confronts Pero and the others, they try to convince Cosimo that they can split the take equally, but he hits Rosalind for betraying him and threatens to kill anyone who tries to pull off “his” Bellini.

Rosalind becomes disheartened and leaves the group but Pero finds that he is falling for Carmela, who reveals that the aunts will be out of town for several days. That same night Cosimo dies in a bus accident. Basil meets Leon's sister, Michelle, and they begin dating although she tells him that she wants “an honest man". After Babitch watches the group attend Cosimo's funeral Pero decides to bribe him in exchange for turning a blind eye while they do the heist, and gives Babitch the $16,000 which he has lied about spending.

On the night of the heist, Riley leaves his baby with Rosalind but while on his way to meet up at Pero's apartment he gets his arm broken by the men he stole the video camera from. He arrives with one arm in a cast and “high” from a bottleful of Vicodin. Leon, having found out about his sister's affair, arrives to confront Basil. Basil then reveals that he can't go on the heist because he's now taken an honest job in order to be worthy of Michelle, and leaves. During the heist itself, everything that can go wrong, does. Toto loses his pants, Pero bites off the tip of his tongue, and they find that their floor plans are out of date when they break through the wrong wall (into the kitchen) at 3 am. They realize there is not enough time left to reach and crack open the safe, but Toto finds $1,000 in a cookie jar and so they decide to heat some soup on the apartment stove so as to eat before leaving – whereupon the stove blows up. After the explosion, the group is standing at the bus stop. Riley suggests that they shouldn't see one another again, but just as he gets on the bus the other three decide to give Riley all of the $1,000 for his wife's jail fine. Leon heads home to apologize to his sister and tells Pero to let him know when he gets another Bellini, and before Pero also leaves Toto asks him about Carmela, and tells him that it's important to have someone to walk with, more so than money.

Cast
 William H. Macy as Riley
 Isaiah Washington as Leon
 Sam Rockwell as Pero "Pepe" Mahalovic 
 Michael Jeter as Toto
 Luis Guzmán as Cosimo
 Patricia Clarkson as Rosalind
 Andrew Davoli as Basil
 George Clooney as Jerzy
 David Warshofsky as Sergeant Babitch
 Jennifer Esposito as Carmela
 Gabrielle Union as Michelle

Reception

Box office
Receiving only a limited release domestically, the film earned $378,650 in the United States and Canada, and $4,606,284 worldwide, against a production budget of $8–12 million.

Critical response
On Rotten Tomatoes 55% of critics have given the film a positive review based on 67 reviews, with an average rating of 5.88/10. The site's critics consensus reads, "Contains some funny moments, but it's still a very lightweight comedy." On Metacritic, the film has a weighted average score of 61 out of 100 based on 22 critics, indicating "generally favorable reviews".

Roger Ebert gave the film 2.5 out of 4 and asked if the problem was that he had seen the original, but says "I can see how someone might enjoy this movie, coming to it for the first time." Todd McCarthy for Variety said the film "generates agreeable feelings for its sweetly clueless characters along with a few decent laughs", praising the performances of the actors but criticizing the thin material.

References

External links
 
 
 
 
 

2002 films
2000s crime comedy films
2000s heist films
American crime comedy films
American remakes of Italian films
American heist films
Films directed by Anthony and Joe Russo
Films produced by Steven Soderbergh
Films scored by Mark Mothersbaugh
Films set in Cleveland
Films shot in Cleveland
Warner Bros. films
2002 directorial debut films
2002 comedy films
Films about the Serbian Mafia
2000s English-language films
2000s American films